Uruguay names in space include:

Asteroids
 5088 Tancredi
 5996 Julioangel
 9478 Caldeyro
 10691 Sans

External links
 http://fisicamartin.blogspot.com/2017/06/asteroides-uruguayos.html

Space program of Uruguay
Astronomical nomenclature by nation